Miyako (written: , , , ,  or  in hiragana) is a feminine Japanese given name. Notable people with the name include:

, Japanese voice actress
Miyako Inoue (anthropologist) (born 1962), American anthropologist
, Japanese photographer
, Japanese voice actress
, Japanese manga artist
, Japanese actress and professional wrestler
, Japanese fashion model
, alter ego of Japanese professional wrestler Misaki Ohata (born 1989)
, Japanese basketball player
, Japanese voice actor
, Japanese speed skater
, Japanese synchronised swimmer
, Japanese actress
, Japanese volleyball player
, Japanese ballet dancer

Fictional characters
, a character in the manga series Hidamari Sketch
, a character in the video game Melty Blood
, a character in the anime series Powerpuff Girls Z
, a character in the anime series Digimon Adventure 02
, a character in the anime series Ghost Hound
, a character in the visual novel ef - a tale of memories
, a character in the visual novel Maji de Watashi ni Koi Shinasai!
, a character in the light novel series A Sister's All You Need

, a character in the manga series Kamikaze Kaito Jeanne
Miyako Kajiro, a character in the survival horror video game Forbidden Siren

See also
Harumi Miyako (born 1948, surname Miyako, given name Harumi), enka singer

Japanese feminine given names